José María Velasco Ibarra (19 March 1893 – 30 March 1979) was an Ecuadorian politician. He became president of Ecuador five times, in 1934–1935, 1944–1947, 1952–1956, 1960–1961, and 1968–1972, and only in 1952–1956 he completed a full term. In his four other terms, he was removed by military force, and several times he was installed as president through a military coup.

Early life and career

Velasco Ibarra was born on 19 March 1893 in Quito. His parents were Delia Ibarra and Alejandrino Velasco, a civil engineer. His father was a political activist in the conservative party during the dictatorship installed by the liberal revolution. He was home schooled by his mother. His father died when he was 16. He attended high school at Colegio San Gabriel and obtained a JD (Doctorate in Jurisprudence) from the Central University of Ecuador. As an author he published several books, including Conciencia y Barbarie, and was also a columnist for El Comercio.

His first public post was in Quito's Municipal Government, where he supervised works and visited communities. His political career began when he was named a Deputy of the Republic. In 1932, he was elected as Vice President of the Chamber of Deputies and several days later, Presidents of the Chamber of Deputies.

Presidencies
In 1933, he stood in the Ecuadorian presidential election and received 80% of the votes cast, the highest in Ecuadorian history. Velasco Ibarra traveled through several Latin American countries, including Peru, and restored Ecuador's global image. His first presidency began on 1 September 1934, but he was ousted in August 1935 by the military. He went into exile in Colombia, where he worked in the Santander School in Sevilla, which was named the best school in Colombia. Later, he traveled to Buenos Aires, where he worked as a university professor.

He stood again in the 1940 election and was defeated by the Radical Liberal Party candidate Carlos Arroyo del Río by a small margin. Arroyo del Río lacked Velasco Ibarra's popularity and public support, which indicated that there had been a fraud. Velasco Ibarra plotted a coup d'état with pilots from the Salinas Air Force base. Before executing his plan, he was detained and exiled again.

1944 was an especially acute crisis, following the defeat of Ecuador in a war with Peru. There was a bitter rivalry between the conservative regular army and the more radical national police (the 'carabineros'). High inflation had soured the people. Velasco Ibarra built his coalition using the rhetoric of moral reform, calling for the virtuous common people to rise against the corrupt and selfish oligarchy. Velasco presented himself as the embodiment of positive moral qualities, appealing to both Left and Right without presenting any precise political program. Thanks to the "Glorious Revolution" of May 28th, he was named Supreme Chief of the Republic and was later named Constitutional President by the Constituent Assembly. In August of 1947, he was again deposed by the military. Three defense ministers perpetrated the coup against Velasco Ibarra; among them was minister Mancheno, who later was his successor.

In 1952, he again won the presidential election, and began his third term as president on September 1, 1952. This time, he served his entire term, which ended on August 31, 1956. His third term was a time of progress for Ecuador: 311 schools were constructed, with another 104 in progress. More than 1359 km of roads were constructed, and 1057 km more were improved.
Velasco Ibarra was a noted orator: in his political campaigns from town to town, he captivated people with eloquence, becoming a leader of the masses. Velasco Ibarra once said, "Give me a balcony and I will become president."

In 1960, he was elected president for the fourth time and was removed on November 7, 1961. In 1960, he nullified the Rio de Janeiro Protocol, which led to conflicts between Ecuador and Peru, including Paquisha in 1981 and the War of El Cenepa in 1995.

Finally, in 1968, Velasco Ibarra won the presidency for a fifth time. This government ended abruptly on February 15, 1972, when once more he was deposed in a bloodless coup, which brought General Guillermo Rodríguez Lara to power. In total, Velasco Ibarra governed nearly 13 years, making him the longest-serving president in Ecuadorian history (although Rafael Correa's decade-long presidency from 2007 until 2017 is the longest continuous presidency). The events surrounding the end of his fifth and last presidency are dealt with in Philip Agee's book Inside the Company: A CIA Diary.

Velasco was a fiery populist who did not have a formal party organization. Rather it was his populist rhetoric that attracted enthusiastic followers, as he presented himself as the advocate of the poor and downtrodden. In office he was not responsible for major reforms, but he used patronage effectively to maintain his largely inefficient and corrupt administrations. 

There is debate about whether his rule can correctly be labelled as populist. Following Agustin Cueva, several authors have argued that in the midst of a hegemonic crisis Velasco rose to power on the votes of the coastal sub-proletariat, peasants who had migrated to urban centres as the cacao industry dwindled. The charismatic figure of Velasco, according to this view, emotionally captured the masses with promises of redemption. Others, among them Rafael Quintero, argue that the entrenched landowning elite was instrumental for Velasco's victory (at least in the 1930s), as the Coastal elite had been weakened by the end of the cacao boom.

Works
Velasco Ibarra always had a special preoccupation with infrastructure. Many public works, including roads, hospitals, and bridges, were constructed during Velasco Ibarra's presidencies. He was the initiator of institutions such as the Supreme Electoral Tribunalián and Guamote. He decreed the law of weekly days off for workers, ordered the construction of irrigation canals, educational infrastructure, aircraft fields, and highways.

Death
Velasco Ibarra's wife, Corina Parral de Velasco Ibarra died in Buenos Aires after falling from a bus. This precipitated the death of Velasco Ibarra, who said on his return to Ecuador, "I come to meditate and to die." He died in Quito, on 30 March 1979.

References

Further reading
 De la Torre, Carlos. "Velasco Ibarra and ‘La Revolución Gloriosa’: The Social Production of a Populist Leader in Ecuador in the 1940s." Journal of Latin American Studies 26.3 (1994): 683-711.
 De la Torre, Carlos. "Populism and democracy: political discourses and cultures in contemporary Ecuador." Latin American Perspectives 24.3 (1997): 12-24. online
 Maier, Georg. "Presidential Succession in Ecuador, 1830-1970." Journal of Interamerican Studies and World Affairs 13#3-4 (1971): 475-509.
 Pyne, Peter. "Presidential Caesarism in Latin America: Myth or Reality? A Case Study of the Ecuadorian Executive during the Presidency of José María Velasco Ibarra, 1960-1961." Comparative Politics (1977) 9#3: 281-304. online

1893 births
1979 deaths
People from Quito
Ecuadorian people of Spanish descent
Presidents of Ecuador
Presidents of the Chamber of Deputies of Ecuador
Ecuadorian columnists
Leaders ousted by a coup
CIA activities in the Americas
World War II political leaders
Grand Crosses Special Class of the Order of Merit of the Federal Republic of Germany